Simona Halperin (born 1969, Riga, Latvia) was the Israeli Ambassador to Singapore and East Timor from 2017 until 2019 when she was replaced by Sagi Karni.,

Beginning in August 2010, Halperin was the head of the Israel Economic and Cultural Office in Taipei (ISECO). It is considered the “officially unofficial” delegation to Taiwan.

Halperin earned an MA degree in Law and Public administration from the Hebrew University in Jerusalem and has a BA in Economics & business administration.

References

Israeli women ambassadors
Ambassadors of Israel to Singapore
Hebrew University of Jerusalem alumni
1969 births
Living people